Micrurus lemniscatus, commonly known as the South American coral snake, is a species of venomous snake in the family Elapidae. The species is endemic to South America.

Description
M. lemniscatus is a thin and brightly colored species. The snout is black, followed by a narrow white crossband in front of the eyes, then a wider black band including the eyes. The eyes are small, and the rest of the head is red. The body pattern consists of slightly broad red rings that are separated by seven to 17 triads of three black and white rings. The tail has two black triads alternating with white rings.

Behavior
Like many coral snakes, M. lemniscatus is nocturnal and terrestrial, digging in loose soil or litter. It is not aggressive towards humans, although it can attack to defend itself.

Reproduction
Breeding of M. lemniscatus is oviparous, having a clutch size of possibly 20 eggs.

Diet
Alimentation of M. lemniscatus is mainly long-bodied vertebrates such as freshwater eels, gymnotiform fishes, caecilians, lizards, and snakes.

Geographic range
M. lemniscatus is found in Argentina, northern Bolivia, Brazil, Colombia, eastern Ecuador, French Guiana, Guyana, Paraguay, eastern Peru, Suriname, Trinidad, and Venezuela.

Habitat
 M. lemniscatus is a widespread species in South America, living in humid forests and lowland forests, in open savannas and gallery forests. It is also found in lowland floodplains, deforested areas or near human habitation, in humid areas or near places with a water source.

Venom
The venom of M. lemniscatus is a potent post- and pre-synaptic neurotoxin, which causes a potent and irreversible neuromuscular block in vertebrates. Lemnitoxin, a potent myotoxic PLA2 type toxin, isolated from the venom of M. lemniscatus induces local and systemic myotoxicity after intramuscular and intravenous injection in mice, which is antigenically related to Micrurus nigrocinctus nigroxin, Notechis scutatus notexin, mulgotoxin of Pseudechis australis and textilotoxin of Pseudonaja textilis.

References

Further reading
Boulenger GA (1896). Catalogue of the Snakes in the British Museum (Natural History). Volume III., Containing the Colubridæ (Opisthoglyphæ and Proteroglyphæ) ... London: Trustees of the British Museum (Natural History). (Taylor and Francis, printers). xiv + 727 pp. + Plates I-XXV. (Elaps lemniscatus, p. 430).
Freiberg M (1982). Snakes of South America. Hong Kong: T.F.H. Publications. 189 pp. . (Micrurus lemniscatus, p. 115 + color photograph of M. l. carvalhoi on p. 187).
Jan G, Sordelli F (1872). Iconographie générale des Ophidiens, Quarante-deuxième livraison. Paris: Baillière. Index + Plates I-VI. (Elaps lemniscatus, Plate V, figures 1 & 1*). (in French).
Linnaeus C (1758). Systema naturæ per regna tria naturæ, secundum classes, ordines, genera, species, cum characteribus, differentiis, synonymis, locis. Tomus I. Editio Decima, Reformata. Stockholm: L. Salvius. 824 pp. (Coluber lemniscatus, new species, p. 224). (in Latin).
Roze JA (1996). Coral Snakes of the Americas: Biology, Identification, and Venoms. Malabar, Florida: Krieger Publishing Co. 340 pp. .

lemniscatus
Snakes of South America
Reptiles of Argentina
Reptiles of Bolivia
Reptiles of Brazil
Reptiles of Colombia
Reptiles of Ecuador
Reptiles of French Guiana
Reptiles of Guyana
Reptiles of Paraguay
Reptiles of Peru
Reptiles of Suriname
Reptiles of Trinidad and Tobago
Reptiles of Venezuela
Fauna of the Amazon
Fauna of the Pantanal
Reptiles described in 1758
Taxa named by Carl Linnaeus